Marcus Sternberg (born 14 September 1965) is a German music video director.

Biography 
Sternberg studied at the International Film School in London and is currently living in Berlin and Buenos Aires. Besides music videos he also directs commercials. He received an ECHO Award in the category Best National Video for his work on No Angels' video for "Something about Us."

Slant Magazine voted his Run DMC vs. Jason Nevins "It's Like That" one of the 100 Greatest Music Videos. "Killer choreography and silky camera moves are director Marcus Sternberg's visual weapons of choice."

His work includes story-videos featuring German film actors Helmut Berger, Anna-Maria Mühe, Esther Schweins and Franz Dinda.

Sternberg is currently operating out of his own production company Free The Dragon with offices in Berlin and Buenos Aires.

Filmography

Selected music videos
 Anastacia – Best Of You (2012)
 Anastacia – Stupid Little Things (2014) 
 Melanie C - Rock Me
 Run DMC vs. Jason Nevins – It's Like That
 Schiller & Colbie Caillat – You
 Nena & Helmut Berger – Besser Geht's Nicht
 MarieMarie – Under The Neon Sky
 Nena – Das Ist Nicht Alles
 Kosheen – Guilty
 Paul van Dyk & Saint Etienne – Tell Me Why (The Riddle)
 Nena – 99 Red Balloons 2002
 Lexington Bridge feat. Snoop Dogg – Real Man
 Aura Dione – Something From Nothing
 Xavier Naidoo – Wo willst du hin (with Esther Schweins, Steffen Wink)
 Sugarplum Fairy – Sail Beyond Doubt
 Söhne Mannheims – Dein Glück liegt mir am Herzen
 Dante Thomas – Caught In The Middle
 Fettes Brot – Nordish by Nature
 Nena & Heppner – Haus Der Drei Sonnen
 Ich + Ich – So soll es bleiben
 Frida Gold – Unsere Liebe Ist Aus Gold
 Schiller & Xavier Naidoo – Sehnsucht
 No Angels – Something About Us
 Schiller & Thomas D. – Die Nacht
 Kim Frank – Lara
 Yvonne Catterfeld + Eric Benét – Where does the love goes
 Christina Stürmer – Engel Fliegen Einsam
 Nena – Leuchtturm 2002
 Schiller & Heppner – Dream of you
 Echt – Wo bist du jetzt?
 De Phazz – The Mambo Craze
 Jam & Spoon – Stella

Selected commercials 
 Adidas Brand Summit Film 2008
 11899 / Nena
 Bärenmarke
 Reno / Nena
 Weisser Riese / Nena

External links 
 marcus-sternberg.com official homepage
 Marcus Sternberg at clipland.com
 www.slantmagazine.com/music/features/greatestmusicvideosi.asp

German music video directors
1965 births
Living people